Linda Bernard (born 7 December 1950) is a British figure skater. She competed in the pairs event at the 1968 Winter Olympics.

References

External links
 

1950 births
Living people
British female pair skaters
Olympic figure skaters of Great Britain
Figure skaters at the 1968 Winter Olympics
Sportspeople from Hampshire